Exodus: Gods and Kings is a 2014 American biblical epic film directed and produced by Ridley Scott and written by Adam Cooper, Bill Collage, Jeffrey Caine, and Steven Zaillian. The film stars Christian Bale, Joel Edgerton, John Turturro, Aaron Paul, Ben Mendelsohn, Sigourney Weaver, and Ben Kingsley. It is inspired by the biblical episode of the Exodus of the Hebrews from Egypt led by Moses and related in the Book of Exodus. Development on the film was first announced by Scott in June 2012. Filming occurred primarily in Spain beginning in October 2013, with additional filming at Pinewood Studios in England.

The film was released on December 12, 2014 by 20th Century Fox, to generally negative reviews; critics praised the visual effects and cast performances, but criticized its inaccuracy to the source material and the whitewashing in the film. The film was also banned in Egypt and in the United Arab Emirates for "historical inaccuracies". It earned $268 million worldwide on a budget of $140–200 million.

Plot

In 1300 BC, Moses, a general and accepted member of the Egyptian royal family, prepares to attack an encamped Hittite army with Prince Ramesses at Kadesh. A High Priestess divines a prophecy from animal intestines, which she relates to Ramesses's father, Seti I. She tells the two men of the prophecy, in which "a leader" (either Moses or Ramesses) will be "saved" and the savior "will someday lead." During the battle, Moses saves Ramesses' life, leaving both men troubled. Later, Moses volunteers to go to the city of Pithom in place of his cousin to meet with the Viceroy Hegep, who oversees the Hebrew slaves. Upon his arrival, he encounters the slave Joshua being lashed and questions the vicious lashing. Moses is appalled by the horrific conditions the slaves must toil in. Moses meets with the slave elders to see if the slaves are planning on sedition as claimed by the Viceroy. After said meetings, Moses receives a message via Joshua that Nun is looking for him. Moses finds Nun in the prayer house where Nun informs him of his true lineage; he is the child of Hebrew parents who was sent by his sister Miriam to be raised by Pharaoh's daughter (he was born during the extermination of the Jewish heirs). Moses is stunned at the revelation and leaves angrily; during which he is attacked by two guards whom he quickly kills. However, two Hebrew spies overhear Nun's story and report their discovery to the Viceroy.

Moses returns home where soon after Seti dies, and Ramesses becomes the new Pharaoh (Ramesses II). Hegep, the viceroy reveals Moses's true lineage to Ramesses, but Ramesses is unconvinced. At the urging of Queen Tuya, he interrogates the servant Miriam, who denies being Moses's sister. When Ramesses threatens to cut off her arm, Moses intervenes saving her and confirms he is a Hebrew. Although Tuya wants Moses killed, Ramesses, still unwilling to believe the story, exiles him instead. Before leaving Egypt, Moses meets with his adopted mother and Miriam, who refer to him by his birth name of Moshe. Following a journey into the desert, Moses comes to Midian where he meets Zipporah and her father, Jethro. Moses becomes a shepherd, marries Zipporah, and has a son, Gershom.

Years later, Moses is injured in a rockslide. He encounters a burning bush and a boy, a messenger of the God of Abraham. While recovering, Moses reveals his past to Zipporah and reveals what God has asked him to do. This drives a wedge between the couple, but Moses leaves anyway. In Egypt, Moses reunites with Nun and Joshua, as well as meeting his brother Aaron for the first time. Moses confronts Ramesses, demanding the Hebrews be released from servitude. Ramesses refuses to listen, insisting that freeing them is economically impossible. Upon Moses threatening Ramesses's life, Ramesses orders Moses's death, as well as killing random Hebrew families until Moses is found. Using his military skills, Moses trains the slaves and leads them in an insurgency, prompting Ramesses to retaliate harshly. God's messenger appears to Moses and explains that ten plagues will affect Egypt. The first nine plagues deal massive damage to Egypt and its people, but Ramesses does not back down, even oppressing his own people to maintain his position. Moses is horrified to learn from God that the tenth plague will be the death of all firstborn children but follows through with the plan, instructing the Hebrews to protect themselves by covering their doors with lambs' blood. That night, all of Egypt's firstborn children die, including Ramesses's infant son. Ramesses, devastated, surrenders, allowing the Hebrews to leave.

During the Exodus, the Hebrews follow Moses's original path through the desert towards the Red Sea. Still grieving his son, Ramesses assembles his army and gives chase. After making their way through a dangerous mountain pass, Moses and the Hebrews arrive at the edge of the sea, uncertain about what to do. In despair, Moses flings his sword into the sea, which recedes and clears a path to the opposite side. Ramesses and his army continue the pursuit, but Moses stays behind to confront them. The Red Sea reverts back, drowning the majority of the Egyptians who are still crossing. Moses survives and rejoins the Hebrews. Ramesses also survives, but is distraught and stunned over the destruction of his army, and with no apparent way to return to Egypt. Moses leads the Hebrews back to Midian, where he reunites with Zipporah and Gershom. At Mount Sinai, Moses transcribes the Ten Commandments which will be his replacement as the law when he dies. Years later, an elderly Moses riding with the Ark of the Covenant sees God's messenger walking with the Hebrews through the desert.

Cast
 Christian Bale as Moses
 Joel Edgerton as Ramses II
 John Turturro as Seti I
 Aaron Paul as Joshua
 Ben Mendelsohn as Viceroy Hegep
 María Valverde as Zipporah
 Sigourney Weaver as Tuya
 Ben Kingsley as Nun
 Isaac Andrews as Malak
 Hiam Abbass as Bithiah
 Indira Varma as High Priestess
 Ewen Bremner as Expert
 Golshifteh Farahani as Nefertari
 Ghassan Massoud as Ramses' Grand Vizier, Paser
 Tara Fitzgerald as Miriam
 Dar Salim as Commander Khyan
 Andrew Tarbet as Aaron
 Ken Bones as Ramses' Scribe
 Philip Arditti as Viceroy Hegep's Aide

Anton Alexander has a small role as the Israelite Dathan, while Kevork Malikyan appears as Zipporah's father, Jethro.

Production

Development and writing
In June 2012, Ridley Scott announced that he was developing an adaptation of the Book of Exodus, tentatively titled Moses. On March 27, 2014, the studio changed the title of the film from Exodus to Exodus: Gods and Kings.

Some controversy and criticism arose concerning biblical accuracy of the script and its portrayal. Ridley Scott publicly stated that he would be looking to natural causes for the miracles, including drainage from a tsunami for the parting of the Red Sea. According to Scott, the parting of the Red Sea was caused by a tsunami believed to have been triggered by an underwater earthquake off the Italian coast around 3000 BC. Christian Bale said of Moses, whom he portrayed, "I think the man was likely schizophrenic and was one of the most barbaric individuals that I ever read about in my life." Author Brian Godawa responded, "It's accurate to portray Moses as an imperfect hero, so Christians won't take issue with that, but to be so extreme as to call him one of the most barbaric people in history, that sounds like he's going out of his way to distance himself from the very people you’d think he wants to appeal to." The CEO of Faith-Driven Consumer, Chris Stone, criticized Bale's comments, "There's nothing in the biblical history that supports that. It's an indication that there will be a tremendous disconnect between Bale’s interpretation and the expectations of the market" and suggested that Christians would not go to cinemas to see the film.

Casting

On March 15, 2013, Deadline Hollywood reported Scott wanted Christian Bale to star in the film; in August he confirmed the role to be Moses. On the same day, Joel Edgerton joined the cast to play Ramses and production was set to begin in September. The studio announced the casting calls in Spain's Almería and Pechina for 3,000 to 4,000 extras, and on the island of Fuerteventura for another 1,000 to 2,000 extras. On August 27, Aaron Paul joined the film to play Joshua. Sigourney Weaver, Ben Kingsley, and John Turturro were then still negotiating about joining the cast.

The Sydney Morning Herald and Christian Today reported that the casting of white actors in the lead roles was being criticized. Four white actors were cast to play the Hebrew and Egyptian lead characters: Christian Bale as Moses, Joel Edgerton as Ramses II, Sigourney Weaver as Queen Tuya, and Aaron Paul as Joshua. The Sydney Morning Herald also reported the online community's observations that the film gives a European profile to the Great Sphinx of Giza. Christian Today reported that an online petition was underway. It also compared Exodus to the 1956 film The Ten Commandments with its all-white cast and said, "The racial climate, number of black actors, and opportunities provided to them were very different in 1956, however." Some Twitter users called for a boycott of the film.

More so, Forbes Scott Mendelson said that the film did not need to be "whitewashed" and stated that "Even if we accept the argument that Moses had to be played by a world-renowned movie star and that in all likelihood that meant a white actor, I do not accept the idea that the rest of the main cast needed to be filled out with Caucasian actors of varying recognizability."

Scott responded that without the casting of big-name actors, the film would never have been approved by the studio. He said, "I can't mount a film of this budget...and say that my lead actor is Mohammad so-and-so from such-and-such...I'm just not going to get financed," and that those seeking to boycott the film on such grounds should "get a life". Bale also defended the casting of the film, suggesting audiences need to support big budgeted films starring people of color and stating, "The change will come from independent filmmaking, but audiences have to be there. Because once that happens, financiers of bigger and bigger budget films will say, 'We can actually do business here.

Filming and post-production

Shooting of the film began in October 2013 in Almería, Spain. Additional filming was scheduled at Pinewood Studios, England. Shooting began on October 22 in Tabernas as the first and main location was Ouarzazate (Morocco), and in Sierra Alhamilla. The Red Sea scene was filmed at a beach on Fuerteventura, one of the Canary Islands off the northwest coast of Africa. Shooting lasted 74 days.

VFX supervisor Peter Chiang supervised the film's visual effects. He said that "Ridley wanted to convey the sense that everything could be natural phenomenon, like an eclipse or tsunami, not just someone waving a stick at the sea."

More than 1,500 visual effects shots were created to digitally bolster the ranks of the Hebrews and to help authentically render plagues of hail, locusts, and frogs, although 400 live frogs were used on the set. There were 400,000 humans depicted in total, with 30 to 40 people accompanying Bale while crossing the Red Sea and the rest being computer generated. CGI produced the 180-foot wave, the horses, and the chariots. In close-up shots of people fleeing across the sea bed, the filmmakers used the beach's real waters. For the hailstorm scene, the special effects team built 30 special cannons that would fire polymer balls to bounce and shatter with the same characteristics as an ice ball. The distant hail is a computer simulation.

In an interview for Access Hollywood, Scott claimed there is a "final" version of the film 4 hours long.

Music
On July 8, 2014, it was announced that Alberto Iglesias would be scoring the music for the film with additional music by Harry Gregson-Williams.

Release
The film was released on the first weekend of December 4 and 5 on 6,462 screens and in markets such as South Korea, Mexico, Hong Kong, India. Nationwide release in North America was on December 12 in 3,503 theaters. It was released in the United Kingdom on December 26. It was released in 2D, 3D, and IMAX 3D.

Exodus was banned in Egypt. The Egyptian culture minister described it as "a Zionist film", and said it was banned because of "historical inaccuracies", such as creating a false impression that Moses and the Jews built the pyramids.

In Morocco, the state-run Moroccan Cinema Centre (CCM) initially approved the film's screening, but officials banned it on the day before its premiere because of the personification of the voice of God. After some of the film's dialogue had been edited, the film was subsequently approved for screening.

The film was also denied release in the United Arab Emirates. Authorities said they had found "many mistakes" in the story. The director of Media Content Tracking at the National Media Council explained: "This movie is under our review and we found that there are many mistakes not only about Islam but other religions too. So, we will not release it in the UAE."

The film was dedicated to director Ridley Scott's brother Tony Scott, who died on August 19, 2012.

Reception

Box office
Exodus: Gods and Kings grossed $65 million in the U.S. and Canada and $203 million in other territories for a worldwide total of $268.2 million. The film earned $8.7 million on its opening day (including previews) in the United States. The film topped the box office during its opening weekend with $24.1 million.

Outside North America, the film was released in 10 markets on December 4–5 and earned $23.1 million from 6,462 screens on its opening weekend. The following week it earned $17.8 million from 27 international markets, coming at second place at the box office behind The Hobbit: The Battle of the Five Armies. The film was number one in 13 markets. In its third week, the film added $30.9 million from 39 markets and was still halted at number two behind The Battle of the Five Armies.

The highest openings came from Russia ($8 million), Brazil ($6.68 million), South Korea ($6.2 million), Mexico ($5.4 million), France ($5.35 million), the UK ($4.25 million), Spain ($3.7 million), and Germany ($3.64 million). At the end of its theatrical run, Spain proved to be the most successful country with $18.1 million followed by Russia, Brazil, France, and the UK.

Critical response
Exodus: Gods and Kings received generally negative reviews from critics. They praised its acting performances and technical achievements, but criticized its pacing, thin screenwriting, and lack of character development. The film veered creatively from the Bible and Scott's honesty about his own atheist beliefs did not help appeal to a potential audience of believers. The film has a score of 30% on Rotten Tomatoes based on 210 reviews, with an average rating of 5.00/10. The critical consensus states, "While sporadically stirring, and suitably epic in its ambitions, Exodus: Gods and Kings can't quite live up to its classic source material." On Metacritic, the film has a score of 52 out of 100, based on 42 critics, indicating "mixed or average reviews". Audiences surveyed by CinemaScore gave the film a grade "B−" on scale of A to F.

Stephen Farber of The Hollywood Reporter gave a positive review and said, "Scott did a great job reviving the Roman sand-and-sandals epic when he made the Oscar-winning Gladiator. This Egyptian saga is not quite in the same league, but it confirms the director's flair for widescreen imagery. Exodus has the added kick of 3D technology, and it has enough eye-popping set pieces to please adventure fans." Peter Travers of Rolling Stone was positive toward the film and said, "Exodus is a biblical epic that comes at you at maximum velocity but stays stirringly, inspiringly human." Reagan Gavin Rasquinha of The Times of India gave the film 4 out of 5 stars and said, "Exodus: Gods and Kings is 'spectacle' with a capital 'S' and in more ways than one, definitely epic." Catherine Shoard of The Guardian gave 3 out of 5 stars and said, "It’s impossible not to feel some awe at the spectacle, but more shocks would have helped see you through the two-and-a-half hour running time." Phillips Hawker of The Sydney Morning Herald gave a mixed review and awarded the film 3 out of 5 stars, saying, "Exodus: Gods And Kings... lacks Gladiator's full-on intensity and committed central performances, however; it's a mixture of the grand and the bland, and when it's not spectacular it's a little plodding." Justin Chang of Variety said, "Some may well desire a purer, fuller version of the story, one more faithful to the text and less clearly shaped by the demands of the Hollywood blockbuster. But on its own grand, imperfect terms, Exodus: Gods and Kings is undeniably transporting, marked by a free-flowing visual splendor that plays to its creator's unique strengths: Given how many faith-based movies are content to tell their audiences what to think or feel, it's satisfying to see one whose images alone are enough to compel awestruck belief." Jim Vejvoda of IGN said, "Director Ridley Scott gets lost in the desert at times in Exodus: Gods and Kings, his epic, but not entirely effective take on the story of Moses's journey from an Egyptian Royal to Hebrew leader."

On the negative side, Scott Mendelson of Forbes criticized the film for being too "dark" and "gritty", saying that the film lacked in humor and excitement, offering little nuance and little artistic interpretation beyond hitting the expected goal posts. He added, "Ridley Scott’s Exodus: Gods and Kings is a terrible film. It is a badly acted and badly written melodrama that takes what should be a passionate and emotionally wrenching story and drains it of all life and all dramatic interest." Pete Hammond of Deadline Hollywood said, "Ridley Scott [can] do a plague well, and here, he gets to do 10 of them. But is this oh-so-familiar tale still fresh enough to get people into theaters in the droves needed to make back the very high production values that we see on screen?" Alonso Duralde of The Wrap also gave a negative review and said, "If you're going into Exodus: Gods and Kings thinking that director Ridley Scott is going to give the Moses story anything we didn't already get from Cecil B. DeMille in two versions of The Ten Commandments, prepare to be disappointed."

See also
 Gods of Egypt
 The Ten Commandments (1956) and The Prince of Egypt (1998, animated), the two previous major Hollywood blockbuster films based on the Book of Exodus.
 List of films featuring slavery
 Whitewashing in film

References

External links

 
 
 
 
 

2014 films
2014 3D films
2010s adventure films
20th Century Fox films
American 3D films
American adventure drama films
American epic films
British 3D films
French epic films
Portrayals of Moses in film
English-language French films
English-language Spanish films
Films about Christianity
Films about Jews and Judaism
Films about slavery
Films about the ten plagues of Egypt
Films based on the Book of Exodus
Films directed by Ridley Scott
Films produced by Peter Chernin
Films set in ancient Egypt
Films set in the 13th century BC
Films shot in the Canary Islands
Films shot at Pinewood Studios
IMAX films
Religious epic films
Scott Free Productions films
Films with screenplays by Steven Zaillian
Films scored by Alberto Iglesias
Films shot in Almería
Films with screenplays by Jeffrey Caine
Cultural depictions of Nefertari
Religious controversies in film
Race-related controversies in film
Casting controversies in film
Chernin Entertainment films
2010s English-language films
2010s American films
2010s French films